John-Allen Månsson (2 July 1934 – 3 November 2003) was the fourth on the Åredalens CK curling team (from Åre, Sweden) during the World Curling Championships (known as the Scotch Cup) 1963 (Skip) and 1964.

In 1966 he was inducted into the Swedish Curling Hall of Fame.

References

External links
 

1934 births
2003 deaths
Swedish male curlers
Swedish curling champions